"Gabriel's Message" or "The angel Gabriel from heaven came" is a Basque Christmas folk carol about the Annunciation to the Virgin Mary by the archangel Gabriel that she would become the mother of Jesus Christ the Son of God.

Text 
It quotes the biblical account of the Annunciation (Luke, Chapter 1, verses 26–38) and Mary's Magnificat (Luke 1.46–55) with the opening lines:

The angel Gabriel from heaven came,
his wings as drifted snow, his eyes as flame;
"All hail", said he, "thou lowly maiden Mary,
most highly favoured lady." Gloria.

A Basque folk carol, originally based on Angelus Ad Virginem, a 13th or 14th Century Latin carol, it was collected by Charles Bordes and then paraphrased into English by Sabine Baring-Gould, who had spent a winter as a boy in the Basque country. The tune is called "Gabriel's Message". It is commonly performed in an arrangement by Edgar Pettman published in his 1892 book Modern Christmas Carols.

The use of the lilting phrase "Most highly favoured lady" made it the favourite carol of Richard Harries, Bishop of Oxford.

Recordings 
Notable modern interpretations include a track on Sting's single "Russians" (1985) and on his album If on a Winter's Night... (2009). Sting's interpretation of this carol is part of the best-selling album A Very Special Christmas, first released in 1987. English rock band Marillion recorded a version for their 1999 fan club-exclusive album Christmas.Marillion, which was also performed on their 2003 DVD Christmas in the Chapel. Canadian roots musicians Terry McDade and The McDades on their 2001 release "Midwinter".
In 2004, it was recorded by Aled Jones on his album The Christmas Album. Christian rock band Jars of Clay also recorded a version for their 2007 Christmas Songs album. Charlotte Church recorded a version of this song for the 2000 Holiday album Dream a Dream. Amanda Palmer is featured on Amazon's Exclusive Holiday Playlist "All Is Bright" singing the song a cappella accompanied by a choir. Madonna use this reference to the Virgin Mary (Intro) on her The MDNA Tour on 2012. Ukrainian singer, composer and multi-instrumentalist Dilya made his version of "Gabriel's Message" in Ukrainian folk tradition using bandura, guitar and organ with ethnic female back vocals. It is the first single from his Christmas EP with the same name, due to be released on December 20, 2015. Moya Brennan, the singer of the Irish band Clannad, recorded the song on her Christmas album of 2005, An Irish Christmas.

See also
 List of Christmas carols

References

External links 

 
 
 

Advent songs
Basque music
Christmas carols
Marian hymns
Sting (musician) songs